The Bemrose School is a foundation trust all-through school situated on Uttoxeter New Road, Derby, England, with an age range of pupils from 3 – 19. Opened as a boys' grammar school in 1930, it became a co-educational comprehensive school in 1975. It then became an all-through school with the addition of a primary phase in 2014.

History
A new school called the Derby Municipal Secondary School for Boys was founded in Abbey Street, Derby, and opened on 12 September 1902. In December 1923, a new site for the school was acquired in Uttoxeter Road, Derby, and for some years was used for games. New school buildings designed by the architect Alexander Macpherson were built on the new site in 1928–1930 at a cost of £71,746, and when the school moved into them in 1930 it was renamed Bemrose School, in honour of the services to education of the Bemrose family of Derby, and in particular of Henry Howe Bemrose. The new school was officially opened on 11 July 1930 by Sir Charles Trevelyan, President of the Board of Education.

A memorial to the sixty-eight old boys of the former Derby Municipal Secondary School who died in the First World War was moved to the new school's main corridor where it remains to this day.

The school was originally divided into seven houses, each with its own colour and motto: Burke (Nil nisi bene), Drake (Semper audacter), Gainsborough (Vis unita fortior), Nelson, Newton (Consilio et animis), Sidney (Animo et fide), and Wellington (Pactum serva). By 1968 these seven houses had been reduced to four: Burke, Newton, Sidney and Wellington. In present times, the houses remain but they are now named after stately homes in Derbyshire – Chatsworth, Hardwick, Haddon, Kedleston.

The school became a grammar school, until in 1975 it was merged with Rykneld Boys' Secondary Modern School to make a new comprehensive school, when girls were first admitted, named Bemrose Community School. When Bemrose became a Foundation Trust school, its name was changed to The Bemrose School.

In 2015, a new building was built and a Primary Phase was opened, making Bemrose an all-through school for ages 3–19. Work began in 2017 on a £14 million three-year refurbishment and expansion programme that will create places for an additional 700 pupils at the school.

Headteachers
1930–1951: W. A. Macfarlane MA (Oxon.) (previously head of the Derby Municipal Secondary School for Boys, 1923–1930)
1951–1957: Eric G. Bennett MA (Cantab.)
1958–1971: W. Raymond C. Chapman (Innsbruck), previously head master of Firth Park Grammar School, Sheffield
1972–1983: W. M. Wearne MA, previously head master of the Anglo-Colombian School, Bogota
1983–1993: Robert Hobson
1993–1997: Robert Kenney
1998–2000: Julian Chartres
2001–2003: Richard Feist
2004–2016: Joanne Ward
2016– : Neil Wilkinson (Executive Headteacher)

Old Bemrosians
See also Old Bemrosians.

Boys' grammar school
 Prof F. S. Northedge (1918–85), Professor of International Relations from 1968-85 at the London School of Economics (LSE)
 Michael Knowles (born 1937), actor Dad's Army, It Ain't Half Hot Mum; co-adapter Dad's Army (radio series)
 James Bolam (born 1935), actor
 Richard Turner (artist) (1940–2013)
 John Tilley (1941–2005), Labour MP
 Stephen Marley (born 1946), novelist
 Sir Nigel Rudd (born 1947), industrialist
 Prof Joe Andrew (born 1948), Professor of Russian Literature at Keele University
 Prof John Loughhead OBE FREng (born 1948), Chief Scientific Adviser since 2014 of DECC, and President from 2007-08 of the IET
 Trevor East (born 1950), presenter from 1973–78 of Tiswas, Deputy Managing Director from 1995-2005 of Sky Sports, and Director of Sport from 2005-09 of Setanta Sports
 Steve Powell (born 1955), Derby County F.C. midfielder 1971–1985
 Major General Garry Robison CB (born 1958), Commandant-General from 2006–09 of the Royal Marines, and Commandant from 2004-06 of the Commando Training Centre Royal Marines

Bibliography
Grimshaw, Frank, It Was Different in My Day (2002)
Baker, Thompson and Sarfras, The History of Bemrose School 1930–2005 (2009)

Elmtree
In 2010 The Bemrose School opened Elmtree, a specialist autism unit, a separate unit to ERF opened some years ago.

References

Defunct grammar schools in England
Secondary schools in Derby
Educational institutions established in 1930
1930 establishments in England
Educational institutions disestablished in 1989
1989 disestablishments in England
Foundation schools in Derby
Primary schools in Derby